Learoyd is a surname of English origin. Notable people with the name include:

 Jonathan Learoyd (born 2000), British-French ski jumper
 Richard Learoyd (born 1966), British contemporary artist and photographer
 Roderick Alastair Brook Learoyd (1913–1996), English recipient of the Victoria Cross
 Tom Learoyd-Lahrs (born 1985), Australian rugby league footballer

See also
John Learoyd, one of Rudyard Kipling's 'Soldiers Three' Learoyd, Mulvaney and Ortheris
 Learoyd v Whiteley 1887 English trusts law case

Surnames of English origin